Aircraft on ground or  AOG is a term in aviation maintenance indicating that a problem is serious enough to prevent an aircraft from flying.  Boeing estimates that a 1-2 hour AOG situation will cost an airline $10-20,000, and possibly as high as $150,000.

References

Air freight
Aircraft maintenance